General Fibre Company, also known as the General Moulding Company, was an American manufacturer of a wide variety of fiber and plastic molded products.  The company was known for its popular Ariduk brand of duck and goose decoys.  During World War II, in partnership with the International Hat Company, General Fibre was converted into a war factory for the production of military sun helmets.  Conjointly, the companies were among the largest manufacturers and suppliers of American military pressed fiber sun helmets during World War II.  In the post-war period, the company made an early entry into the emerging plastic injection molding industry, making the transition in material production from fiber to plastic goods.  During the 1960s, the company designed and patented advances in methods of producing pulp articles in the plastics industry. Concurrently, General Fibre became a supplier to Ford Motor Company, in the manufacture of plastic interiors.  The General Fibre Company closed in 1985.

History

When the United States entered World War II, Hawley Products Company and the International Hat Company were commissioned to produce tens of thousands of military sun helmets for the war effort.  George Tilles Jr., the President of International Hat turned to General Fibre Company's President L.T. Apple to supply all the fiber materials for the production of International Hat's pressed fiber military helmets.  Over 100,000 pressed fiber helmets were supplied to soldiers of the United States Marine Corps and Navy.  From World War II to the Gulf War, these pressed fiber pith helmets are noted for the historic length of their combat usage in the United States, outlasting combat usage of the M1 steel helmet by approximately ten years.  The pressed fiber helmet thus has the longest duration of combat usage of any helmet in the history of the United States military.  The helmets were produced through the Vietnam War.  However, later models of International Hat military helmets were made of plastic, after General Fibre converted to plastic injection molding.

Products

M1 Steel Helmet Liner

During World War II, Hawley Products Company was a major producer of the M1 steel helmet.  General Fibre received the subcontract to produce approximately 120,000 of the fiber linings for the M1 steel helmets manufactured by Hawley Products.

Ariduk brand

General Fibre began manufacturing decoy ducks under the Ariduk brand in 1946.  The company mass produced mallards, pin tails, blue bills, black ducks, canvasbacks, oversized mallards, and oversized black ducks. General Fibre also produced two species of Canada goose decoys and two types of crow shooter's kits.  The ducks were of fiber material with realistic glass eyes, a seamless base, and anchor hooks installed on the bottom.  The fiber materials were water proof and constructed to withstand poor weather conditions.  Likewise, the ducks were able to withstand being shot without sinking or leaking.  In the early 1960s, the company stopped making the fiber version of all Ariduk decoy models, switching to plastic.

Presidents
Lewis Tilles Apple (1941–1958)
Frank G. Pellegrino (1958–1985)

See also

International Hat Company
Hawley Products Company

References

Bibliography

External links 
Automatic molding apparatus for forming pulp articles. General Fibre Company patent for plastic molding injection. September 1, 1964.

Manufacturing companies established in 1941
Companies disestablished in 1985
Manufacturing companies based in St. Louis
Privately held companies based in Missouri
Defunct privately held companies of the United States
Defunct manufacturing companies based in Missouri
International Hat Company